Melchior Adam (c. 1575 – 26 December 1622) was a German Calvinist literary historian.

Life
Adam was born in Grottkau, Nysa, Habsburg Silesia (present-day Grodków, Opole Voivodeship). He visited the college in Brieg Brzeg, then studied on various academies with financial support of his benefactor Joachim von Berg. In 1601 he was appointed schoolmaster at the municipal school of Heidelberg, and later became co-rector and professor at the same institution. He died in Heidelberg.

Works

His major achievement consists of a collection of literary biographies, which were printed in Stuttgart and Heidelberg in five volumes: German Philosophers (including philologists, poets, mathematicians and physicists), German Theologians, Foreign Theologians, Jurists and Politicians and Medics. The figures discussed were arranged chronologically by their date of death, most of which lie between 1420 and 1620. His sources were biographical texts, personal records, funeral orations, letters and various academic records.

His 1615 Vitae Germanorum philosophorum (Lives of German philosophers) contains one of the earliest biographies of Nicolaus Copernicus.

He discussed Lutheran theologians in a deprecating manner, as he himself was a Calvinist.

Bibliography
 Vitae Germanorum jureconsultorum et politicorum, qui superiore seculo, et quod excurrit, floruerunt Heidelberg 1611.
 Vitae Germanorum philosophorum … Frankfurt 1610 - Heidelberg 1615  
 Decades duae continentes vitas theologorum exterorum principium. Frankfurt am Main 1618.
 Vitae Germanorum medicorum Heidelberg 1620
 Vitae Germanorum theologorum … Heidelberg 1620
 Vitae Germanorum iureconsultorum et politicorum Heidelberg 1620
 Apographum Monumentorum Haidelbergensium. Heidelberg 1612
 Disce mori oder Sterbekunst. Neustadt a. d. H. 1615
 Parodiae et metaphrases Horatianae. 1616

References

Sources 
Attribution

External links 
 
 Melchior Adam: Vitae online edition in the project Camena
 

1570s births
1622 deaths
People from Grodków
People from Austrian Silesia
17th-century German writers
17th-century German male writers
17th-century German historians
German male non-fiction writers